Jeffrey Tho (born 14 April 1988) is an Australian male badminton player. He competed at the 2010 and 2014 Commonwealth Games. In 2014, he won the gold medal at the Oceania Championships in the men's singles event, he also won bronze in 2008.

Personal life
Prior to beginning his badminton career, Tho worked as a dentist in Ballarat, Victoria.

Achievements

Oceania Championships
Men's Singles

BWF International Challenge/Series
Men's singles

Men's doubles

 BWF International Challenge tournament
 BWF International Series tournament
 BWF Future Series tournament

Victoria Achievements
 Awarded the 2003 Victorian School Blue Award for Badminton
 Runner-up in the U19 Men's Doubles event at the 2005 U19 Australasian Badminton Championships
 Runner-up in the U19 Men's Singles event at the 2005 U19 Australasian Badminton Championships
 Selected into the U17 Victorian Badminton team (2000–2004)
 Selected into the Under 19 Victorian Badminton team from 2002 to 2006
 Winner of the U19 Mixed Doubles title at the 2005 U19 Australasian Badminton Championships

References

External links 
 

Australian male badminton players
1988 births
Living people
People from Ipoh
Australian people of Chinese descent
Commonwealth Games competitors for Australia
Badminton players at the 2014 Commonwealth Games
Badminton players at the 2010 Commonwealth Games